Formaldehyde is the first album by the rock band Terrorvision. Produced by Pat Grogan and the band, the album was recorded at The Chapel in June 1992. They were assisted by Fulton Dingley; Grogan and the band mixed all of the recordings, except for "New Policy One", "My House", and "Human Being", which were mixed by Gil Norton. All songs written and arranged by Terrorvision. The original Total Vegas Recordings version was released in December 1992; the EMI version appeared on 3 May 1993.

Track listing
All songs written by Terrorvision.

"Problem Solved" – 3:41
"Ships That Sink" – 3:27
"American TV" – 4:32
"New Policy One" – 3:29
"Jason" – 4:02
"Killing Time" – 3:22
"Urban Space Crime" – 3:44
"Hole for a Soul" – 4:01
"Don't Shoot My Dog" – 5:27
"Desolation Town" – 2:56
"My House" – 3:06
"Human Being" – 4:00

Alternate track listing
Prior to the EMI version of this album,  the band released a version on their own Total Vegas label. Only 1000 CD copies and 500 vinyl copies were produced. It included two extra tracks that were not present on the later EMI release.

 Problem Solved  – 3:41
 Ships That Sink  – 3:27
 American TV  – 4:33
 New Policy One  – 3:29
 Jason  – 4:02
 Killing Time  – 3:22
 Urban Space Crime  – 3:44
 Hole for a Soul  – 4:01
 Don't Shoot My Dog  – 5:27
 Desolation Town  – 2:56
 My House  – 3:06
 Human Being  – 3:57
 Pain Reliever  – 2:44
 Tea Dance  – 2:05

Personnel
Personnel per booklet.

Terrorvision
 Tony Wright – vocals
 Shutty – drums
 Mark Yates – guitars
 Leigh Marklew – bass

Additional musicians
 Gavin Wright – violin (tracks 6 and 8)
 Nick Roberts – harmonica (track 10)

Production and design
 Pat Grogan – producer, engineer, mixing
 Terrorvision – producer, mixing
 Fulton Dingley – assistant
 Gil Norton – mixing (tracks 4, 11 and 12)

Expanded Edition
In 2013, an expanded 2 CD edition was released by Cherry Red Records. Disc one retains the original EMI track listing. Disc two includes the two additional tracks from the original Total Vegas release, plus subsequent b-sides from Terrorvision single releases, and live tracks.

 Blackbird
 Pain Reliever
 Coming Up
 Tea Dance
 Corpse Fly
 Sailing Home
 Don't Shoot My Dog Again
 Psycho Killer
 Pain Reliever (Live at Don Valley Stadium, Sheffield, 6th June1993)
 Ships That Sink (Live at Don Valley Stadium, Sheffield, 6th June1993)
 Problem Solved (Live at Don Valley Stadium, Sheffield, 6th June1993)
 American TV (Live at Don Valley Stadium, Sheffield, 6th June1993)
 New Policy One (Live at Don Valley Stadium, Sheffield, 6th June1993)
 Still the Rhythm (Live at Don Valley Stadium, Sheffield, 6th June1993)
 Psycho Killer (Live at Don Valley Stadium, Sheffield, 6th June1993)
 Tea Dance (Live at Don Valley Stadium, Sheffield, 6th June1993)
 My House (Live at Don Valley Stadium, Sheffield, 6th June1993)
 My House (Machete Mix)
 Psycho Killer (Extended Mix)
 My House (Attic Mix)

References

1993 debut albums
Terrorvision albums
EMI Records albums